O.S.S. was a Buckeye Productions and ATV co-produced wartime television drama series.

It ran for 26 half-hour monochrome episodes during the 1957–1958 season and was distributed by ITC Entertainment and networked in the United States by ABC.

The series followed the adventures of Frank Hawthorne, an agent with the American Office of Strategic Services, who operated behind Nazi lines in occupied France.

Main cast
 Ron Randell as Captain Frank Hawthorn
 Lionel Murton as The Chief
 Robert Gallico as O'Brien

Guest stars included Lois Maxwell, Christopher Lee and Roger Delgado.

Production
The pilot was shot in November 1956. The budget was around $1,200,000. The star was Australian actor Ron Randell.

Episode list
This episode list is based on the airdate order on ABC, which appears to match the production order and the air-date order for the (unrelated) ABC Weekend TV in the UK.

 "Operation Fracture"
 "Operation Tulip"
 "Operation Powder Puff"
 "Operation Death Trap"
 "Operation Orange Blossom"
 "Operation Pay Day"
 "Operation Foul Ball"
 "Operation Blue Eyes"
 "Operation Flint Axe"
 "Operation Sweet Talk"
 "Operation Big House"
 "Operation Love Bird"
 "Operation Pigeon Hole"
 "Operation Yo-yo"
 "Operation Yodel"
 "Operation Sardine"
 "Operation Firefly"
 "Operation Eel"
 "Operation Barbecue"
 "Operation Blackbird"
 "Operation Post Office"
 "Operation Newsboy"
 "Operation Chopping Block"
  "Operation Dagger"  "Operation Buried Alive"
 "Operation Meatball"
 "Operation Jingle Bells"

References

External links
 CTVA information
 TV.com
 

1950s British drama television series
1957 British television series debuts
1958 British television series endings
Espionage television series
Television series by ITC Entertainment
American Broadcasting Company original programming
ITV television dramas
British military television series
Television shows produced by Associated Television (ATV)
English-language television shows
World War II television drama series
Black-and-white British television shows